Pamela Reed (born April 2, 1949) is an American actress. She is known for playing Arnold Schwarzenegger's hypoglycemic police partner in the 1990 movie Kindergarten Cop and as the matriarch Gail Green in Jericho. She appeared as Marlene Griggs-Knope on the NBC sitcom Parks and Recreation. She is also well known as the exasperated wife in Bean.

Early life and education
Reed was born in Tacoma, Washington, the daughter of Vernie and Norma Reed. She received her B.F.A. at the University of Washington.

Career
Reed earned a Drama Desk Award for the off-Broadway play Getting Out and an Obie Award for "sustaining excellence in performance in theater". She was a regular in the cast of the 1977 CBS drama The Andros Targets. She had minor film and television work in the 1980s. She won a CableAce Award for Best Actress for the HBO series Tanner '88 (1988). She also co-starred with Daryl Hannah in the film The Clan of the Cave Bear (1985).

Her notable film roles include The Long Riders (1980), The Right Stuff (1983), The Best of Times (1986), Kindergarten Cop (1990), Junior (1994), Bean (1997), and Proof of Life (2001).

Reed played Janice Pasetti in the quirky NBC sitcom Grand, and then played a judge and single mother in the short-lived NBC sitcom The Home Court. She has provided the voice for the character Ruth Powers in 4 episodes of the animated TV series The Simpsons and guest-voiced in an episode of the 1994-1995 animated series The Critic. She played a main role in Jericho and has appeared as the mother of main character Leslie Knope (Amy Poehler) on Parks and Recreation.

In 2005 Reed portrayed executive producer Esther Shapiro in Dynasty: The Making of a Guilty Pleasure, a fictionalized television movie based on the creation and behind the scenes production of the 1980s prime time soap opera Dynasty.

Reed has also worked for Storyline Online, reading Stellaluna.

Personal life 
Reed has been married to Sandy Smolan since 1988. Since 2004, she has resided in the Hancock Park neighborhood of Los Angeles with her husband and two children.

Filmography

Film

Television

References

External links

 

1949 births
20th-century American actresses
21st-century American actresses
Actresses from Tacoma, Washington
American film actresses
American stage actresses
American television actresses
Drama Desk Award winners
Living people
University of Washington School of Drama alumni